Richard Carter (11 December 1953 – 13 July 2019) was an Australian actor who appeared in several television series and independent films.

Some of Carter's filmography includes Rabbit-Proof Fence, Hating Alison Ashley, Babe: Pig in the City, Happy Feet Two, Our Lips Are Sealed (with Mary-Kate and Ashley Olsen) and Mad Max: Fury Road, the last of which was his final role.

He died in the early hours of 13 July 2019 after a brief illness.

Filmography

Film

Television

References

External links
 

1953 births
2019 deaths
Australian male film actors
Australian male soap opera actors
Australian male video game actors
Australian male voice actors
Male actors from Sydney
21st-century Australian male actors
20th-century Australian male actors